Craspedolepta is a genus of true bugs belonging to the family Aphalaridae.

The species of this genus are found in Europe, Japan and Northern America.

Species:
 Craspedolepta artemisiae
 Craspedolepta flavipennis
 Craspedolepta nebulosa
 Craspedolepta nervosa
 Craspedolepta sonchi
 Craspedolepta subpunctata

References

Aphalaridae
Taxa named by Günther Enderlein
Insects described in 1921